Blue Tiger and Blue Tigers may refer to:

 Maltese tiger, a suspected (but exceedingly rare) blue-coloured tiger
 Blue tigers, the butterfly genus Tirumala
 Tirumala limniace, an Indian milkweed butterfly species
 Tirumala hamata, another Indian milkweed butterfly species
 "Blue Tigers", a 1977 short story
 ADtranz DE-AC33C, a diesel electric railway locomotive, nicknamed the "Blue Tiger"
 Blue Tiger (film), a 1994 action/thriller directed by Norberto Barba
 Blue Tigers, a moniker for the India national football team